Zdeněk Bárta (15 May 1891 – 1 April 1987) was a Bohemian fencer. He competed in the individual épée and sabre events at the 1912 Summer Olympics.

References

External links
 

1891 births
1987 deaths
People from Ledeč nad Sázavou
People from the Kingdom of Bohemia
Czech male fencers
Olympic fencers of Bohemia
Fencers at the 1912 Summer Olympics
Sportspeople from the Vysočina Region